Brian Palermo is an American character actor, science communicator, and comedian. He has appeared in a number of television shows, commercials and movies. Palermo is also a writer whose credits include Warner Brothers' Histeria! and Disney's The Weekenders and Dave The Barbarian, both created by Doug Langdale. He is also a co-author with Randy Olson and Dorie Barton of the 2003 book, Connection: Hollywood Storytelling Meets Critical Thinking.

Career
His film credits include The Social Network, My Life In Ruins, Daddy Day Care and Big Momma's House among others. Television credits include Entourage, Friends, Gary Unmarried, 90210, Zeke and Luther, The Middle, State of Georgia, Will and Grace, Digimon Data Squad, Malcolm In The Middle, Henry Danger, and Danger Force.

Palermo has appeared numerous times on The Tonight Show with Jay Leno, though in April 2011 he started doing "correspondent" pieces where he played "The Humanalyzer," pretending he can analyze dreams to prove how gullible people are. These are introduced live by Palermo and Jay Leno.
  Palermo has also appeared as a recurring character on Tyler Perry's House of Payne as Phil who adopts a fake French accent and persona as "Phillipe."

Palermo is a member of the improvisational and sketch comedy group called "The Groundlings," based in Hollywood, California. He both performs and teaches with this company. He has performed alongside many well-known comedians such as Will Ferrell, Eddie Izzard and Harland Williams.

Palermo won the 1988 "Big Easy" award for Best Actor for his role as "Teach" in David Mamet's American Buffalo.

Palermo appeared on the podcast Skepticality, where he spoke to host Derek Colanduno about teaching improv for 15 years at The Groundlings. He came to use improv to help scientists improve their communication skills thanks to Randy Olson. He states: "The idea is to get people's attention with the emotional stuff first, then hit them with the substance." 
He got a series of small parts in cinema, played a computer science professor in the movie The Social Network, he also had a part in Thank You for Smoking and others.
 
"The book brings a very cerebral subject down to a level that almost everybody can understand."

Palermo ran a hands-on workshop at the Ocean Sciences Meeting in February 2020 on "How to Make Your Science Communication More Effective."

His Palermo Improv Training project is a consultancy whose goal is to facilitate improv training for various applications within the worlds of corporate, science communication and improv comedy. According to Palermo, "An alarmingly large number of the world's population are misinformed and uninterested in scientific issues that have incredible impacts on all of our lives. And part of correcting this situation must be improving our science communications with people at every level of our societies. But most scientists get precious little communications training." His clients include Jet Propulsion Laboratory, National Park Service, and the USDA.

In 2003, Palermo, along with Randy Olson and Dorie Barton, published Connection: Hollywood Storytelling Meets Critical Thinking. The book brings together a former scientist (Olson), a story consultant (Barton), and an improv actor (Palermo) to explain how critical thinking in science combined with a century of Hollywood knowledge is used in the creation and shaping of stories. It also provides the narrative tools for effective communication.

Bibliography

Filmography

Film

Television

References

External links
You Tube Brian Palermo's YouTube Channel
Twitter Brian Palermo's Twitter feed

Living people
American male comedians
21st-century American comedians
American male television actors
Year of birth missing (living people)